Macrothumia kuhlmannii is a species of trees native to Bahia, Espírito Santo, and Minas Gerais states of Brazil and is the only member of the genus Macrothumia. Formerly classified in the genus Banara in the family Flacourtiaceae, phylogenetic analyses based on DNA data indicate that this species, along with its close relatives in Ahernia, Hasseltia, and Pleuranthodendron are better placed in a broadly circumscribed Salicaceae. Macrothumia differs from its close relatives in having a congested fascicle- or umbel-like inflorescence and a large (>3 cm diameter) fruit. The genus name is derived from the Greek word μακροθυμία, which means long-suffering and enduring patience.

References

Salicaceae
Monotypic Malpighiales genera
Salicaceae genera